Atole (is believed to come from Nahuatl ātōlli ), also known as atolli and atol de elote. However, it is also believe to come from Mayan origin.  It is a traditional hot corn- and masa-based beverage of Mexican origin. Atole can have differnet flavors added such as vanilla, cinnamon, and guava. Chocolate atole is known as champurrado or atole. It typically accompanies tamales and is very popular during Day of the Dead (observed November 2) and Las Posadas (Christmas holiday season).

Mayan Origin 
Many Classic Maya painted vessels feature a genre of inscriptions known as the “dedicatory formula” or the “primary standard sequence” (PSS) and the two main ingredients mentioned in the contents section of the PSS were cacao and atole. As other Maya vessels are looked over they find atole made with sweet potatoes.

In Mexico
In Mexico, the drink typically includes masa (corn hominy flour), water, piloncillo (unrefined cane sugar), cinnamon, vanilla, and optional chocolate or fruit. The mixture is blended and heated before serving.  Atole is made by toasting masa on a comal (griddle), then adding water that was boiled with cinnamon sticks. The resulting blends vary in texture, ranging from a porridge to a very thin, liquid consistency. Atole can also be prepared with rice, wheat, or oatmeal in place of masa.  In northern Mexico,  a variation is also made using pinole (sweetened toasted corn meal).  Although atole is one of the traditional drinks of the Mexican holidays Day of the Dead and Las Posadas, it is very common during breakfast and dinnertime at any time of year. It is usually sold as street food.

In many parts of Mexico and in the United States in communities with Mexican cultural roots, atole is a traditional comfort food.  It is often eaten as a breakfast or an after dinner snack on cold days. In New Mexico, blue corn atole is finely ground cornmeal toasted for cooking, consumed  as a grainy porridge-style drink served warm, usually sweetened with sugar and/or thinned with milk.  It is usually served at breakfast like cream of wheat or oatmeal. Elders are said to have  drunk atole because it gave them energy and if a mother is nursing it gives her more milk.

In Central America

In Guatemala, Honduras, El Salvador, and Nicaragua, atol de elote (maize atol) is a popular beverage. Pineapple atol (atol de piña) is also consumed in El Salvador.

Salvadoran varieties include atol shuco ("dirty" atol, a reference to its darker color), particularly popular in the Cabañas region.  A emblematic variation exists in Nicaragua, called pinolillo.  In some parts of Honduras, fresh corn is ground and the expressed liquid is used as the base (instead of masa).

Guatemala 
In Guatemala, the National Institute of Child Health and Human Development provided funding to INCAP to carry out a community randomized trial to test the hypothesis that improved protein intakes lead to better child development test scores. They were given a high-protein drink called Atole. The Atole was made from INCAPARINA (a vegetable protein mixture developed by INCAP which mainly contains corn), dry skim milk, sugar, and a flavoring agent.

See also

 Avena (drink)
 Brose
 Chicha morada
 Horchata
 Gruel
 Pozol
 List of hot beverages
 List of maize dishes
 List of porridges

References

Cuisine of the Southwestern United States
Day of the Dead food
Guatemalan cuisine
Hot drinks
Maize-based drinks
Mesoamerican cuisine
Mexican drinks
New Mexican cuisine
Non-alcoholic drinks
Porridges
Salvadoran cuisine